"Eazy-Duz-It" is a song by American rapper Eazy-E. It was released as the lead single from the album of the same name. It features the song "Radio" as a B-side. The B-side of the cassette single also contained the original version of the song "Compton's N the House" which only appears on the cassette single version, the vinyl single has a radio edit of "Eazy-Duz-It" instead of "Compton's N the House". There is a remix version of "Compton's N the House" that appears on N.W.A.'s Straight Outta Compton album, but the original can only be found on the cassette single and has never been released elsewhere.

"Eazy-Duz-It" was produced by Dr. Dre with co-production by DJ Yella, with Eazy-E's production debut.

Slim Thug sampled the line "...thug from around the way..." to make the song "Thug" from his Boss of All Bosses album. Also, the song's line was sampled by both Memphis, Tennessee acts Three 6 Mafia in "Ridin' Spinners", and Yo Gotti on his song "Thug from Around the Way".

Logic also sampled the song's intro in the creation of the instrumental for the song "Under Pressure". The intro has been cut short and looped to create the instrumental.

The song famously starts out with a female voice (possibly Michel'le) singing a parody of the theme from Gumby before getting cut off by Eazy.

Single track listing

A-side
"Eazy-Duz-It" – (4:18)
"Ruthless Villain" – (2:57)

B-side
"Radio" – (5:00)
"Eazy-Duz-It" (radio version) – (3:47)

Cassette single B-side
"Radio"
"Compton's N the House / 100% Diss (Dedicated to the Wacky Wack Crew)"

References 

Eazy-E songs
1989 singles
Song recordings produced by Dr. Dre
Songs written by MC Ren
1988 songs
Ruthless Records singles
Gangsta rap songs
Comedy rap songs